Marco Barollo (born 31 July 1972 in Milan) is a retired Italian football player.

External links

1972 births
Living people
Italian footballers
Serie A players
Serie B players
U.S. Lecce players
Ternana Calcio players
Inter Milan players
Venezia F.C. players
Brescia Calcio players
A.C. Cesena players
Empoli F.C. players
Association football midfielders